Thanks To Science, We've Got Love is Jonathan Seet's third album, not officially released to the public in CD format but released digitally in 2008.  This is the first album of Seet's that includes a cover song, "I Will Wait For You."

Track listing
 "A Million Hungry Eyes" – 4:36
 "Just Try" – 3:33
 "Come On" – 3:40
 "Killing All My Friends" – 5:29
 "It's Not Enough" – 4:11
 "I Will Wait For You" – 3:19
 "Fashion Tips For The Homeless" – 3:21
 "Watching You Sleep" – 4:08
 "My Wasted Youth" – 3:53
 "Your Secret's Out" – 3:23
 "The Kind Of Girl I Am" – 5:12
 "All Over You" – 4:20
 "The End Of The Tape" – 3:45

References
https://listserv.unb.ca/cgi-bin/wa?A2=ind0711&L=chsrcharts&P=321
http://cdbaby.com/cd/seet2

Jonathan Seet albums
2008 albums